Northwest Regional Learning Center (NRLC) is an alternative secondary school for disenfranchised and adjudicated young people. It was formerly located in Everett, Washington and hosted by the Snohomish County Juvenile Rehabilitation Administration. The school moved to Shoreline in the 2009–10 school year and shared a property with the Snohomish Discovery School program. The 2010–11 school year prompted another move from Shoreline back to Everett to a former Boeing classroom building. In 2011, NRLC was welcomed into the northern wing of the Weston High School campus, located in Arlington, WA. There are no current plans to move for 2012.

Northwest Regional Learning Center is administered by the Northwest Educational School District 189 (ESD189), located in Anacortes. The ESD189 provides services to Western Washington school districts on a contract basis depending on their needs. In this case, NRLC is a service provided to Snohomish County school districts in Washington State.

The student population is small, numbering most often under 40 students. The school includes a Social Studies Department, a Science and Math Department, an Independent Studies wing, an integrated Language Arts curriculum, and a dedicated Special Education department.

Most classes are under 15 students, and each class is staffed with one teacher and one instructional assistant to provide for better individualized instruction to meet the needs of each student.

Participating Washington State School Districts
Arlington
Edmonds
Everett
Granite Falls
Lake Stevens
Marysville
Mukilteo
Snohomish

External links
 http://www.lwsd.wednet.edu/district/pdffiles/NWRLCAgreement09-10.pdf
 http://www.nwesd.org
 http://www.governor.wa.gov/news/news-view.asp?pressRelease=741&newsType=1
 http://nwesd.schoolwires.com/151010411350167/site/default.asp
 http://www.heraldnet.com/article/20090613/NEWS01/706139942
 http://nrlc.nwesd.org
 http://www.nwesd.org/nrlc

Alternative schools in the United States
Schools in Snohomish County, Washington
Shoreline, Washington
Private high schools in Washington (state)